Diplorhynchus is a monotypic genus of plant in the family Apocynaceae native to tropical and southern Africa. , Plants of the World Online recognises the single species Diplorhynchus condylocarpon.

Description
Its fragrant flowers feature a white to creamy corolla. Vernacular names for the plant include "horn-pod tree" and "wild rubber". The species' local traditional medicinal uses include as a treatment for indigestion, diarrhoea, fever, snakebite, infertility, venereal disease, diabetes, pneumonia and tuberculosis.

Distribution and habitat
Diplorhynchus condylocarpon is native to an area from southern parts of the Republic of the Congo to the north of Namibia in the west and large parts of northern South Africa in the southeast. Its habitat is dry woodland and hillsides from sea-level to  altitude.

References

External links
 

Monotypic Apocynaceae genera
Rauvolfioideae